Ferenc Mészáros (11 April 1950 – 9 January 2023) was a Hungarian footballer who played at both professional and international levels as a goalkeeper.

Career
Born in Budapest, Mészáros played club football in Hungary and Portugal for VM Egyetértés, Vasas SC, Sporting CP, Farense, Győri ETO and Vitória Setúbal,

Mészáros earned a total of 29 caps for Hungary, and represented them at the 1978 and 1982 World Cups.

References

1950 births
2023 deaths
Footballers from Budapest
Hungarian footballers
Hungary international footballers
Association football goalkeepers
Vasas SC players
Sporting CP footballers
S.C. Farense players
Győri ETO FC players
Vitória F.C. players
Nemzeti Bajnokság I players
Primeira Liga players
Segunda Divisão players
1978 FIFA World Cup players
1982 FIFA World Cup players
Hungarian expatriate footballers
Expatriate footballers in Portugal
Hungarian expatriate sportspeople in Portugal
20th-century Hungarian people
vasas SC managers
Hungarian football managers